Naubise is a village development committee in Dhading District in the Bagmati Zone of central Nepal. At the time of the 2011 Nepal census it had a population of 25621 and had 3239 houses in it.

To Promote local culture Naubise has two FM radio station Radio Rajmarga - 92.1 MHz Which is a Community radio Station and Krishi Radio-101.5 MHz that features agriculture related programs.

During 2015 earthquake in Nepal, the VDC was totally devastated but only  26deaths were caused. To the earthquake victims of this VDC, assistance was provided by LEO club of peace khanikhola, UNICEF, WFP and many other NGOs and INGOs. This VDC is the most developed VDC in dhading district. The main occupation of people is agriculture. Education sector of this VDC is strong and consist of altogether 28 schools.

References
 

Populated places in Dhading District